Jorge Luis Calderón Pérez (born February 10, 1994, in León, Guanajuato) is a Mexican professional footballer who last played for Club León Premier.

References

External links
 

1993 births
Living people
Mexican footballers
Club León footballers
Liga MX players
Liga Premier de México players
Tercera División de México players
Footballers from Guanajuato
Sportspeople from León, Guanajuato
Association footballers not categorized by position